Don Q is a Puerto Rican brand of rum.

Don Q may also refer to:

 Don Q (rapper), American rapper
 Don Q, Son of Zorro, a 1925 silent film

See also
 Don Quixote (disambiguation)